Eorhopalosoma is an extinct genus of wasps in family Rhopalosomatidae. It was found in Burmese amber

Taxonomy
The genus contains the following species:
Eorhopalosoma gorgyra Engel, 2008
Eorhopalosoma lohrmanni Boudinot and Dungey, 2020

References

Hymenoptera genera
Fossil taxa described in 2008
Taxa named by Michael S. Engel
Rhopalosomatidae
Burmese amber

Prehistoric insect genera